Tsuntinsky District is an administrative and municipal district (raion), one of the forty-one in the Republic of Dagestan, Russia. It is located in the southwest of the republic. Its administrative center is the rural locality (a selo) of Tsunta. As of the 2010 Census, the total population of the district was 18,282, with the population of Kidero, the district center at the time, accounting for 4.1% of that number.

History
Between 1991 and 2017 the selo of Kidero served as the administrative center of Tsuntinsky District, however, it lacks the necessary infrastructure. In 2017, the district center was moved into the selo of Tsunta.

Administrative and municipal status
Within the framework of administrative divisions, Tsuntinsky District is one of the forty-one in the Republic of Dagestan. The district is divided into twelve selsoviets which comprise fifty-five rural localities. As a municipal division, the district is incorporated as Tsuntinsky Municipal District. Its twelve selsoviets are incorporated as thirteen rural settlements within the municipal district. The selo of Tsunta serves as the administrative center of both the administrative and municipal district.

Demographics
Ethnic composition:
Tsez people: 53.9%
Bezhta people: 35.1%
Hunzib people: 4.8%
Hinukh people: 2.7%
Russians: 1.2%

The main languages are Tsez and Hinuq.

References

Notes

Sources

Districts of Dagestan